The Christian Brothers' College, Mount Edmund (formerly Christian Brothers' College St. Gabriel's until 1969) is a private, Roman Catholic high school in Pretoria, South Africa.

For a number of years the College has supported a small Pre School in Soshanguve known as Emmanuel Place of Hope. This school has grown from a settlement on a landfill site to a functional container school with classrooms, a playground and staff seeing to the needs of the children. Through the initiative of past pupils of the College and a small contingent of staff, the project has grown and in 2015 involved every pupil, parent and staff member at the College.

Principals and headmasters

References

External links
 School Website

Catholic secondary schools in South Africa
Schools in Pretoria
Private schools in Gauteng
High schools in South Africa
Congregation of Christian Brothers secondary schools
1922 establishments in South Africa
Educational institutions established in 1922